Lori Glazier (born September 19, 1971) is a Canadian retired snowboarder, who participated in the halfpipe event at the 1998 Nagano Winter Olympics.

References

1971 births
Living people
Snowboarders at the 1998 Winter Olympics
Olympic snowboarders of Canada
Canadian female snowboarders